Fakhri Mohammed Salman is an Iraqi former football forward who played for Iraq between 1957 and 1959. He scored a goal in the first international match of Iraq, against Morocco in the 1957 Pan Arab Games.

Career statistics

International goals
Scores and results list Iraq's goal tally first.

References

Iraqi footballers
Iraq international footballers
Association football forwards
Possibly living people
Year of birth missing